King Manfred (König Manfred), Op. 93 is a grand romantic opera in 5 acts by Carl Reinecke to libretto by Friedrich Roeber . It was composed in 1866 and staged in 1867.

History
The music was composed from April to December 1866 in Leipzig, where Reinecke was already director of the Gewandhaus concerts and professor at the Leipzig Conservatory. The first performance took place at the Royal Court Theater of Wiesbaden on 26 July 1867 with Wilhelm Jahn as conductor. Although it was a huge success, the opera remained in repertoire only for a while (a printed libretto appeared as late as in 1881). The Overture and the Prelude to Act V were among Reinecke's most favorite compositions.

The full score of the opera was published by Breitkopf & Härtel in 1868, as well as the vocal score, prepared by composer himself. Several popular excerpts were published in different arrangements.

Roles

Synopsis
The opera deals with Manfred, 13th-century King of Sicily (1232-1266), against whom was half Europe: eventually he fell in battle against Charles I of Anjou. The action takes place in 1266 in Naples and Benevento.

List of musical numbers
The following list is based on the Breitkopf & Härtel 1868 vocal score.
 
Overture
Act I
No. 1. Chor
No. 2.
No. 3. Arie mit Chor
No. 4. Sextett mit Chor
No. 5. Recitativ und Arie
No. 6. Recitativ
No. 7. Lied mit Chor
No. 8. Recitativ und Terzett
No. 9. Finale
Act II
No. 10.
No. 11. Duett
No. 12. Solo mit Chor
No. 13.
No. 14. Duett
No. 15. Lied
No. 16. Scene und Duett
 
Act III
No. 17. Chor
No. 18. Recitativ und Terzett
No. 19. Chor und Ballett
No. 20. Finale 
Act IV
No. 21. Entr'act
No. 22. Duett mit Ballett
No. 23. Recitativ und Duett
No. 24. Duett
No. 25. Recitativ und Arie
No. 26. Recitativ
No. 27. Arie
No. 28. Finale
 
Act V
No. 29. Vorspiel
No. 30. Recitativ
No. 31. Romanze
No. 32. Recitativ und Arie
No. 33. Recitativ und Scene
No. 34. Recitativ und Chor
No. 35. Recitativ
No. 36. Arioso und Schlusschor

Recordings
 (rec. 1987) Carl Reinecke: Symphony No. 1; King Manfred (Overture; Nos. 21 & 29; part II of No. 19) — Rhenish Philharmonic Orchestra, Alfred Walter — Marco Polo 8.223117 (reissued Naxos 8.555397)
 (rec. 2013, 2014, 2016) Carl Reinecke: Orchestral Works, Vol. 1: Symphonies 1 & 3; König Manfred (Overture; Nos. 21 & 29) — Münchner Rundfunkorchester, Henry Raudales — cpo 555 114-2

References

External Links

19th-century German libretto
An anonymous review of the first performance in: 

Operas by Carl Reinecke
1866 operas
German-language operas
Operas